Martin Løwstrøm Nyenget (born 1 April 1992) is a Norwegian cross-country skier.

He competed in four events at the 2012 Junior World Championships, winning a bronze medal in the relay. He later recorded two 6th places at the 2014 Junior World Championships and a fifth place  at the 2015 Junior World Championships.

He made his World Cup debut in March 2014 in the Holmenkollen 50 km race, collecting his first World Cup points in March 2015 in Lahti with a shock fourth place. The next time he broke the top ten happened in February 2016, again in Lahti.

He represents the sports club Lillehammer SK.

Cross-country skiing results
All results are sourced from the International Ski Federation (FIS).

World Championships

World Cup

Season standings

Individual podiums
 1 victory – (1 )
 7 podiums – (6 , 1 )

Team podiums
 5 podiums – (4 , 1 )

References 

1992 births
Living people
Sportspeople from Lillehammer
Norwegian male cross-country skiers